Robbo is primarily a nickname, often given to those with the surname Robinson or Robson. It may refer to:

People
 King Robbo (1969–2014), English graffiti artist
 Andy Robertson (born 1994), Scottish footballer
 Ashley Robinson (born 1982), Women's National Basketball Association player
 Brian Robertson (guitarist) (born 1956), Scottish rock guitarist best known as a member of Thin Lizzy and Motörhead
 Bryan Robson (born 1957), English footballer and football manager
 Derek Robinson (trade unionist) (1927–2017), trade union spokesman nicknamed "Red Robbo"
 Geoff Robinson (rugby league, born 1957), Australian rugby league footballer
 John Robertson (politician, born 1962)  (born 1962), Australian politician
 Mark Robinson (journalist) (born 1967), Australian sports journalist
 Michael Roberts (footballer) (born 1959), Australian rules footballer and television sports reporter
 Paul Robinson (footballer born December 1978), English footballer
 Peter Robertson (triathlete) (born 1976), Australian triathlete
 Russell Robertson (born 1978), Australian rules footballer
 Gary Robson (darts player) (born 1967), English darts player nicknamed "Big Robbo"

Fictional characters
 Robbo, hero of the movie Robin and the 7 Hoods, played by Frank Sinatra
 Robbo (Home and Away), from the Australian soap opera Home and Away
 Robbo Slade, from the Australian soap opera Neighbours

Other uses
 Robbo (video game), a 1989 game for the Atari XL/XE and other platforms
 Rebbo or Robbo, an archaeological site in Israel
 Robertson, New South Wales, a village known as Robbo to locals

Lists of people by nickname